Barronopsis is a genus of funnel weavers first described by R. V. Chamberlin & Ivie in 1941.

Species
 it contains seven species:

Barronopsis arturoi Alayón, 1993 – Cuba
Barronopsis barrowsi (Gertsch, 1934) – USA, Cuba, Hispaniola
Barronopsis floridensis (Roth, 1954) – USA, Bahama Is.
Barronopsis jeffersi (Muma, 1945) – USA, Cuba
Barronopsis pelempito Alayón, 2012 – Hispaniola
Barronopsis stephaniae Stocks, 2009 – USA
Barronopsis texana (Gertsch, 1934) – USA

References

External links

Agelenidae
Araneomorphae genera
Spiders of the Caribbean
Spiders of the United States